Taishan is a town under the administration of Da'an City in northwestern Jilin province, China, located  northwest of downtown Da'an along G12 Hunchun–Ulanhot Expressway and China National Highway 302. , it has 16 villages under its administration.

See also
List of township-level divisions of Jilin

References

Township-level divisions of Jilin
Da'an, Jilin